In human mitochondrial genetics, Haplogroup P is a human mitochondrial DNA (mtDNA) haplogroup.

Origin
Haplogroup P is a descendant of Haplogroup R.

Distribution
Today, P is most commonly found in Oceania, especially in Papuans, Melanesians, indigenous Australians, It's 1.4% in mainstream Filipinos but 1.13% in Luzon, 1.78% in Visayas, 1.43% in Mindanao. It is much higher in Sub-Filipinos groups, 6.67% in Bugkalot and 11.2% in Maranao. It was found in the Philippines Negrito Aeta of Bataan at 40%. It is also found in the Malaysians at 0.9%, including Indonesians.

Subclades

Tree
This phylogenetic tree of haplogroup P subclades is based on the paper by Mannis van Oven and Manfred Kayser Updated comprehensive phylogenetic tree of global human mitochondrial DNA variation and subsequent published research.

P
(16176)
P1
P1d
P1d1
P2'10
P2
P10
P8
P3
P3a
P3b
P3b1
P4
P4a
P4a1
P4b
P4b1
P5
P6
P7
P9

See also

Genealogical DNA test
Genetic genealogy
Human mitochondrial genetics
Population genetics

References

External links
General
Ian Logan's Mitochondrial DNA Site 
Mannis van Oven's Phylotree
Haplogroup P
Expanding Southwest Pacific Mitochondrial Haplogroups P and Q

P